The Cabinet of Kiribati is the cabinet (executive branch) of the government of the Republic of Kiribati.

The initial text of the Constitution of Kiribati (art.40) specifies that the Cabinet "shall consist of the Beretitenti, the Kauoman-ni-Beretitenti and not more than 10 other Ministers, and the Attorney-General". Members of the Cabinet are appointed by the President, from among Members of Parliament (art.41). Since October 2016, a change of the Constitution text allows more than 10 ministries and retires the Attorney General from the Cabinet.

All ministries but one are headquartered in South Tarawa, from Betio to Bikenibeu. The Ministry of Line and Phoenix Islands Development is situated in London, Kiribati on Kiritimati.

Current Cabinet

The current Cabinet consists of the following Ministers:

The first nine ministers sworn in on 2 July 2020 at the State House in Bairiki (South Tarawa) and include Dr Teuea Toatu, Willie Tokataake, Ruateki Tekaiara, Ribanataake Awira, Dr Tinte Itinteang, Boutu Bateriki, Booti Nauan, Martin Moreti and Taabeta Teakaiao.

The remaining four ministers who was stranded in the outer islands, at their respective island, which include Alexander Teabo, Tarakabu Tofinga, Tekeeua Tarati and Mikarite Temari, will be sworn later.

Previous cabinets

From March 2016 to April 2020, President of Kiribati is Taneti Maamau. His first cabinet includes Alexander Teabo and other politicians.

3rd Tong Cabinet 2011-2016
Following his re-election as president in January 2012, Anote Tong appointed the following Cabinet. Several of his previous ministers having lost their seat in the October 2011 parliamentary elections, he sought and obtained the support of newly elected MPs, notably from the Opposition Maurin Kiribati party.

Maurin Kiribati members who joined the government also joined the BTK party. Party keys below indicate each minister's initial affiliation following the 2012 election.

In October 2013, two ministers -Communications, transport and tourism Minister Taberannang Timeon and Public works and energy Minister Kirabuke Teiaua- resigned, after revelations that they had received excessive allowance payments, and amidst calls that they be sacked for misconduct. They were replaced by Rimeta Beniamina and Waysang Kum Kee. Additionally, Tangariki Reete was appointed to the newly created position of Minister for Women, Youth and Social Affairs.

In February 2014, Boutu Bateriki, the Minister for Labour (Maurin Kiribati), resigned after being charged with assaulting his former wife. He was replaced by Martin Moreti.

2nd Tong Cabinet 2007-2011
As of June 2011:

1st Tong cabinet
2003–2007.

Anote Tong, also MFA
Teima Onorio, also Minister for Education, Youth and Sport Development
Titabu Tabane, Attorney general 
Ioteba Redfern, Minister for CIC
Natan Teewe, Minister for CTTD
Martin Tofinga, Minister for ELAD
Nabuti Mwemwenikarawa, Minister for FED
Natanaera Kirata, Minister for HMS
Amberoti Nikora, Minister for IA & SD
Bauro Tongaai, Minister for Labour 
Tawita Temoku, Minister for the Line and Phoenix Islands Development 
Tetabo Nakara, Minister for Fisheries NRD
James Taom, Minister for PWU

2nd Tito cabinet

In March 2002.
Hon. Teburoro Tito, Beretitenti, Minister for Foreign Affairs and International Trade
Hon. Tewareka Tentoa, vice-president (deceased 2000), Minister for Home Affairs and Rural Development, then Beniamina Tinga
Hon. Willie Tokataake, Minister for Education, Science and Technology 
Hon. Beniamina Tinga, Minister for Finance and Economic Planning 
Hon. Anote Tong, Minister for Environment and Natural Development, resigned within a year
Hon. Kataotika Teeke, Minister for Health, Family Planning and Social Welfare 
Hon. Manraoi Kaiea (Marakei), Minister for Communications and Tourism 
Hon. Tanieru Awerika, Commerce, Industry and Employment 
Hon. Emile Schutz, Works and Energy
Hon. Teiraoi Tetabea, Line and Phoenix Islands Development

1st Tito cabinet

Cabinet Ministers 1994-1998:

Tewareka Tentoa, VP and HA & RD
Hon. Kataotika Tekee (North Tarawa), Health, Family Planning and SW
Hon. Manraoi Kaiea (Marakei), Transport C Tourism
Hon. Emile Schutz (Abaiang), Works & Energy
Hon. Tanieru Awerika (Arorae), CI Employment
Hon. Beniamina Tinga (Nikunau), Finance & Economic Planning
Hon. Anote Tong (Maiana), Environment & Natural Rural Development
Hon. Willie Tokataake (Abemama), Education, Science and Technology
Hon. Teiraoi Tetabea (Betio), Line and Phoenix Islands Development
Hon. Tiim Taekiti (Butaritari)
Hon. Timbo Keariki (Kiritimati)
Hon. Tewareka Boorau (Beru)
Hon. Michael N. Takabwebwe, Attorney General, ex-officio.

Teannaki cabinet
Cabinet announced on 8 June 1991 - 1994.

Hon. Teatao Teannaki, Beretitenti (from Abaiang) was sworn in on 3 June 1991. National Progressive Party,
Hon. Taomati Iuta (Beru), vice-president and Minister for Finance and Economic Planning.
Hon. Boanareke Boanareke (Tamana), Inatoa Tebania (Onotoa), Tiwau Awira (Nikunau) from January 1991, Teaiwa Tenieu (Tabiteuea North), all members of the Kiribati Protestant Church from the southern islands constituencies,
The central islands are represented by members from Anterea Kirata Kaitaake (Abemama) and Remuera Tateraka (Maiana), both Roman Catholics,
The northern islands by Tamwi Naotarai (Betio), Baitika Toum (North Tarawa), and Binata Tetaeka (Makin), as well as the Beretitenti himself. All these Ministers were Catholics, but the member for North Tarawa (Mormon).
 Hon. Ieremia Tabai, GCMG (Nonouti), resigned 15 January 1991, replaced by Tiwau Awira
 Hon. Michael N. Takabwebwe, Attorney General, ex-officio.

3rd Tabai cabinet
1987–1991.

Hon. Ieremia Tabai, Beretitenti and Minister for Foreign Affairs 
Hon. Teatao Teannaki, vice-president and Minister of Finance and Economic Development 
Hon. Babera Kirata (Onotoa) for Home and Decentralisation 
Hon. Raion Bataroma (Arorae) for Trade, Industry and Labour, resigned 1990
 Hon. Ataraoti Bwebwenibure (Marakei) for Education
Hon. Baitika Toum (North Tarawa) for World and Energy
Hon. Boanareke Boanareke (Tamana)
Hon. Rotaria Ataia (Maiana) for Health and Family Planning
Hon. Taomati Iuta (Beru) for Natural Resource Development
Hon. Tiwau Awira (Nikunau)
Hon. Uera Rabaua (Butaritari) for Communications
Hon. Ieruru Karotu (Aranuka) (deceased 15 February 1990), then Tekinaiti Kateie, (Abemama) for the Line and Phoenix Group of Islands.
Hon. Michael N. Takabwebwe, Attorney General.

3rd Tabai cabinet 
Cabinet Ministers 1984- 1987

Hon. Babera Kirata, OBE (Onotoa)
Hon. Baitika Toum (North Tarawa)
Hon. Binata Tetaeka (Makin)
Hon. Boanareke Boanareke (Tamana)
Hon. Taomati Iuta (Beru)
Hon. Teewe Arobati (Abemama)
Hon. Tiwau Awira (Nikunau)
Hon. Uera Rabaua (Butaritari)
Hon. Michael N. Takabwebwe, Attorney General, ex-officio.

2nd Tabai cabinet
1982. Cabinet Ministers 1982 - 1984

Hon. Ataraoti Bwebwenibure (Marakei)
Hon. Babera Kirata (Onotoa)
Hon. Baitika Toum (North Tarawa)
Hon. Boanareke Boanareke (Tamana)
Hon. Ieremia Tata (Butaritari)
Hon. Taomati Iuta (Beru)
Hon. Tewee Arobati (Abemama)
Hon. Tiwau Awira (Nikunau)
Hon. R L. Davel, Attorney general, Ex-officio

1st Tabai cabinet
1979–1982.
The following government was announced on 20 July 1979:
 Ieremia Tabai, President 
 Teatao Teannaki, vice-president and Minister for Home Affairs
 Hon. Abete Merang (South Tarawa), for Health and Community Affairs
 Hon. Babera Kirata (Onotoa), for Works and Communications
 Hon. Taomati Iuta (Beru), for Trade, Industry and Labour
 Hon. Ieremia Tata (Butaritari) for Education, Training and Culture
 Hon. Roniti Teiwaki (Betio) for Natural Resource Development 
 Hon. Teewe Arobati (Abemama) for Line and Phoenix Group
 Hon. Tiwau Awira (Nikunau) for Finance
 CJ (Joe) Lynch, then Michael Jennings, Attorney General, ex-officio

References

Cabinet
Kiribati